Ruch Radzionków is a Polish association football club based in Radzionków. The club was disaffiliated in 2012 due to financial problems and the board has decided to withdraw from the competition in season 2012/2013. Instead Ruch Radzionków place to league took back Polonia Bytom, which thus escaped relegation to the second division. The club has finished 1st in the 2017/18 season in the IV division and won the play-offs against Polonia Bytom giving them promotion to the III division.

References

External links 
 

 
Sport in Radzionków
Football clubs in Silesian Voivodeship
Association football clubs established in 1919
1919 establishments in Poland